К-3 was a project 627 "Кит" (kit, meaning "whale"; NATO reporting name "") submarine of the Soviet Navy's Northern Fleet, the first nuclear submarine of the Soviet Union. The vessel was prototyped in wood, with each of five segments scattered between five different locations about Leningrad, including the Astoria Hotel. She was built in Molotovsk, launched on 9 August 1957, commissioned in July 1958, and homeported at Zapadnaya Litsa on the Kola Peninsula. K-3 was designed by Vladimir Peregoudov. Her initial captain was Leonid Osipenko, and the executive officer was Lev Zhiltsov, who had the important task of assembling the first crew.

Arctic voyage
On 17 June 1962, by this time under the command of Zhiltsov, К-3 reached the North Pole underwater, the first among Soviet submarines (a feat performed nearly four years earlier by ). The submarine also surfaced on the Pole (a feat performed three years before by ). For this voyage, she was awarded the name Leninsky Komsomol (Ленинский Комсомол) on 9 October 1962, and her crew, rather than training in military operations, began taking part in many congresses and conferences. This idle life continued until Summer 1967 when a boat that had been scheduled for patrol in the Mediterranean Sea was unavailable. Leninsky Komsomol was tasked with that patrol. She was assigned a new commander, Captain Second Rank Stepanov, and her executive officer arrived aboard only two hours before she put to sea. Whatever the initial material condition of the boat, the crew was not ready for sea.

Once in the Mediterranean, Leninsky Komsomol was given the mission of following an American ballistic missile submarine.

1967 accident

On 8 September 1967, while transiting the Norwegian Sea, a fire broke out in the submarine's hydraulic system, and crew members in the compartment when the fire broke out had to evacuate the compartment. The flames spread to other parts of the submarine. The automatic extinguishers were based on carbon dioxide gas, which killed the crew members who were in the first and second compartments in the submarine. When the dividing door in the bulkhead from the third compartment was opened to see what had happened to the people in the second compartment, the gas spread, and more people lost consciousness. The forward compartments were then completely sealed off, and the submarine surfaced. Four days later, Leninsky Komsomol returned to base. 39 crew members died in the fire.

The subsequent investigation determined that the most probable cause of the fire was ignition of an explosive concentration of hydraulic oil, and that the reactions of the crew were prompt and correct. Numerous rewards were recommended for the crew, including seven nominations for Hero of Soviet Union—four of them posthumous. A later commission from Moscow, however, found a cigarette lighter in the torpedo compartment and found the position of a sailor's body suspicious.  They ruled that the sailor's smoking had caused the fire and prohibited any award.

In 1991 a memorial was erected in Zapadnaya Litsa to the men lost aboard К-3. In 2007 the Russian Awards Committee (Российский наградной комитет) issued the medal "For 50 Years Of The Submarine "Leninskiy Komsomol"".

Retirement 
The submarine was decommissioned in 1988. Since its retirement the K-3 has been docked at the Nerpa Shipyard, Murmansk  The K-3 is set to become part of The Museum of Naval Glory in Kronstadt and is expected to be open for visitors by early 2023.

References

External links 
 "The Triumph and Tragedy of the Leninskiy Komsomol" by Nikolai Cherkashin and Mikhail Lukanin – Official Russian Navy Web Site

November-class submarines
Ships built in the Soviet Union
1957 ships
Maritime incidents in 1967
Cold War submarines of the Soviet Union
Museum ships in Russia